Ocie is an unincorporated community in southwestern Ozark County, Missouri, United States,  from the Taney County line.

A post office was founded in 1907 and was named for resident Ocie Conklin. The post office closed in 1967. Its mail now comes from Theodosia.

References

Unincorporated communities in Ozark County, Missouri
Unincorporated communities in Missouri